Dorcadion sulcipenne is a species of beetle in the family Cerambycidae. It was described by Küster in 1847. It is known from Turkey, Iran, Armenia, and Turkmenistan.

Subspecies
 Dorcadion sulcipenne argonauta Suvorov, 1913
 Dorcadion sulcipenne caucasicum Küster, 1847
 Dorcadion sulcipenne goektshanum Suvorov, 1915
 Dorcadion sulcipenne impressicorne Tournier, 1872
 Dorcadion sulcipenne sulcipenne Küster, 1847

References

sulcipenne
Beetles described in 1847